, also credited Hiroshi Matsumoto, is a Japanese actor, voice actor and narrator from Tokyo. His major roles include Dokugakuji in Saiyuki, Felix Aaron Thenardier in Lord Marksman and Vanadis, and Soichiro Sakurada the patriarch of the Sakurada family in Castle Town Dandelion.

Filmography

Anime roles
2000
Saiyuki (Dokugakuji)
2002
Inuyasha (Serina and Suzuna's father, Izumo, and Gyu-Oh)
RahXephon* Donny Wong
2003
Rockman EXE Axess (Gorou Misaki, BeastMan)
2004
Alice Academy (Jinno)
Mobile Suit Gundam SEED Destiny (Unato Ema Saran)
Naruto (Fugaku Uchiha)
Rockman EXE Stream (Gorou Misaki, BeastMan)
This Ugly yet Beautiful World (Itchō Nishino)
2005
Guyver: The Bioboosted Armor (Sin Rubeo Amniculus)
Ginga Legend Weed (Tōbē)
He Is My Master (Sawatari Father)
Karin (Henry Marker)
MÄR (Halloween)
2006
Bleach: Memories of Nobody (Jai)
2007
Kaze no Stigma (Ryuuya Kazamaki)
Shooting Star Rockman Tribe (Hyde)
2009
Fullmetal Alchemist: Brotherhood (Older Slicer brother)
2010
Bakugan Battle Brawlers: Gundalian Invaders (Coredem)
2012
Naruto Shippuden (Jinpachi Munashi)
2014
Lord Marksman and Vanadis (Felix Aaron Thenardier)
2015
Castle Town Dandelion (Sōichirō Sakurada)
2020
Boruto: Naruto Next Generations (Benga)

Video games
Armored Core: Last Raven (Wanton Busker)
Castlevania: The Dracula X Chronicles (Shaft)
Midnight Club: Street Racing (Larry Muller)
Halo 2 (Arbiter)
Myst V (Esher)
Star Ocean: The Second Story (Zadkiel/Ruprecht)
Valkyrie Profile 2: Silmeria (Heimdall)

Tokusatsu
 Super Sentai World (Emperor Daidas)
 Ninja Sentai Kakuranger (Kakure Daishogun, Tsubasamaru)
 Mechanical Violator Hakaider (Hakaider (Ryo played by Yuji Kishimoto))
 Chōriki Sentai Ohranger (Boss)
 Juukou B-Fighter (Black Dragon (ep. 10), Gun Gibson (ep. 52 - 53))
 Choukou Senshi Changéríon (Ginger (ep. 1))
 B-Robo Kabutack (Cobrander)
 Kyuukyuu Sentai GoGoFive (Supersonic Psyma Beast Blowgene (ep. 15))
 Mirai Sentai Timeranger (Extortionist Keys (ep. 3))
 Hyakujuu Sentai Gaoranger (Bulldozer Org (ep. 10))
 Bakuryuu Sentai Abaranger (Haematsu (ep. 25))
 Ultraman Mebius (Jasyuline (Elder brother (voiced by Shintarou Asanuma (Middle brother) and Haji (Youngest brother)) (ep. 37))
 Juken Sentai Gekiranger (Confrontation Beast Archer fish-Fist Pouōte (ep. 27))
 Samurai Sentai Shinkenger (Ayakashi]] Dokurobou (ep. 29))
 Kamen Rider OOO (Unicorn Yummy (ep. 35 - 36))
 Kaizoku Sentai Gokaiger (Osogain (ep. 18))
 Space Sheriff Gavan: The Movie  (Zan Vardo)
 Kamen Rider Ex-Aid (Alhambra Bugster (ep. 2, 13 - 14, 25 - 26))

Dubbing

Film
200 Cigarettes (Bartender (Ben Affleck))
The 40-Year-Old Virgin (Jay (Romany Malco))
Billy Madison (Frank (Norm Macdonald))
Das Boot (1st Watch Officer (Hubertus Bengsch))
Fantastic Four (2008 NTV edition) (Jimmy O'Hoolihan (Kevin McNulty))
A Good Man (Vladimir (Claudiu Bleonț))
Hit and Run (Quarantine Dude (Joe Hansard))
Last Chance Harvey (Brian (James Brolin))
Love in the Afternoon (DVD edition) (Michel (Van Doude))

Television

The Adventures of Shirley Holmes (Ray Wong (Mig Macario))
Conan the Adventurer (Gokrey (Michael Bailey Smith), The Skull That Talks (Arthur Burghardt))
ER (Nurse Malik McGrath (Deezer D))
She-Wolf of London (Policeman)
Tales from the Neverending Story (Rip Rowdy (Greg Kramer))

Animation
Batman: the Animated Series (Count Vertigo)
Batman: the Brave and the Bold (Black Manta)
George of the Jungle (Ape named Ape)
Shrek Forever After (Pig #2)

References

External links
 Official agency profile 
 Dai Matsumoto at GamePlaza Haruka Voice Acting Database 
 

Living people
Japanese male video game actors
Japanese male voice actors
Male voice actors from Tokyo
Tokyo Actor's Consumer's Cooperative Society voice actors
Year of birth missing (living people)